Motion/Stillness is the second album by American jazz French horn player and composer Tom Varner recorded in 1982 and released on the Italian Soul Note label.

Reception

The AllMusic review by Ken Dryden awarded the album 4 stars and stated, "This 1982 concert features Varner leading an explosive quartet... Highly recommended!".

The authors of the Penguin Guide to Jazz Recordings wrote that the album "depend[s] on satisfying solos to make a modest impact."

Track listing
All compositions by Tom Varner except as indicated
 "Subway Awakening" - 11:22 
 "Study No. 1" - 10:03 
 "Neutron Bomb Shuffle" - 4:59 
 "New Moonshiner" - 13:46 
 "Freddy Did It" - 3:26
 "Indian Summer" (Victor Herbert, Al Dubin) - 9:37 Bonus track on CD   
 "The Otter" - 10:26 Bonus track on CD   
 "Comme Il Faut" (Ornette Coleman) - 7:55 Bonus track on CD   
Recorded at Inroads in New York City on March 19, 1982

Personnel
Tom Varner - French horn
Ed Jackson - alto saxophone
Ed Schuller - bass
Billy Hart (tracks 1-5), Adam Nussbaum (tracks 6-8) - drums

__

cover photo by Bernard Rickenbach, back photos by Tiani Osborn

References

Black Saint/Soul Note albums
Tom Varner albums
1982 albums